Joaquim Pinto (born 20 June 1957) is a Portuguese film director from Porto. His movie What Now? Remind Me was the Portuguese submission for the Academy Award for Best Foreign Language Film in 2014.

References

External links 
 

Portuguese film directors
Living people
1957 births
People from Porto